The 2014–15 Perth Glory FC season was the club's 18th season since its establishment in 1996. They participated in the A-League for the 10th time and the FFA Cup for the first time.

Players

Squad information

Transfers in

Transfers out

Technical staff

Statistics

Squad statistics

|-
|colspan="19"|Players no longer at the club:

Pre-season and friendlies

Competitions

Overall

A-League

League table

Results summary

Results by round

Matches

FFA Cup

Awards
 NAB Young Footballer of the Month (April) – Jamie Maclaren

Footnotes

References

External links
 Official Website

Perth Glory
Perth Glory FC seasons